António Mendes may refer to:

António Mendes Belo (1842–1929), Portuguese bishop
António Mendes Correia (1888–1960), Portuguese scientist
António da Silva Mendes (1939–2019), Portuguese footballer

See also
Antonio Mendez (disambiguation)
Tony Mendes